Patricia Crowther (born 14 October 1927) who also goes by the craft name Thelema, is a British occultist considered influential in the early promotion of the Wiccan religion and she is the mother of the witch or wiccan runes.

Early life
Crowther was born in Sheffield in 1927, then as Patricia Dawson. 
She was initiated into Witchcraft by fellow well-known Wiccan Gerald Gardner in 1960.
(This is incorrect as in fact her handfasting to Arnold was in 1960. This was not the date of her initiation

Career
Along with like Doreen Valiente, Lois Bourne, and Eleanor Bone, Crowther is considered to be one of the "early mothers" of modern Wicca. Patricia and her then-husband, Arnold Crowther (1909–1974), founded the Sheffield Coven in 1961, of which they were High Priestess and High Priest. Crowther has promoted Witchcraft through a number of book publications, contributions to occult magazines and journals, and through a number of interviews with local and national newspapers. She has also appeared several times on television.

In 1971, both Patricia and her then-husband Arnold wrote and presented A Spell of Witchcraft, a radio programme produced and broadcast by BBC Radio Sheffield in six 20-minute parts. The radio programme, the first of its kind in relation to modern Witchcraft as a religion, explored the history and folklore of Witchcraft and presented elements of a local coven's activities and practices within the community.

Books
1965 - The Witches Speak (with Arnold Crowther)(Athol Publications)
 1973 - Witchcraft in Yorkshire (Dalesman) 
 1974 - Witch Blood (The Diary of a Witch High Priestess) (House of Collectibles) 
 1981 - Lid off the Cauldron: A handbook for witches (Muller) 
 1992 - The Zodiac Experience (Samuel Weiser Inc) 
 1992 - The Secrets of Ancient Witchcraft With the Witches' Tarot (Carol Publishing) 
 1992 - Witches Were for Hanging (Excalibur Press of London) 
 1998 - One Witch's World (Robert Hale)  (published in America under the title High Priestess.  Apart from the title, they are the same book) (Phoenix Publishing)   
 2001 - High Priestess: The Life & Times of Patricia Crowther (Phoenix Publishing Inc.) 
 2002 - From Stagecraft to Witchcraft: The Early years of a High Priestess(Capall Bann) 
2009 - Covensense (Robert Hale)

References

External links
 The Mystica site on Patricia Crowther
 The Wicca - Website with some information about Patricia Crowther. 
 Patricia Crowther personal recording from her book Zodiac Experience

1927 births
Gardnerian Wiccans
English Wiccans
Living people
C